"Very Special Part" is a song recorded by American R&B singer Jermaine Jackson and produced by Jackson with Berry Gordy. It was released as the second single from his 1982 album, Let Me Tickle Your Fancy.

Charts

References

1982 singles
1982 songs
Jermaine Jackson songs
Song recordings produced by Berry Gordy